Bulandi is a 2000 Indian Hindi-language drama film. It is a remake of the Tamil movie Nattamai. Starring Anil Kapoor in double role, Rekha and Raveena Tandon. Rajinikanth appears in a special appearance, reprising his role from the Telugu film Pedarayudu.

Plot
The story revolves around Dharamraj "Dada" Thakur. Since the death of his father Gajraj Thakur, Dada Thakur has been the head of the village. His family consists of his wife Lakshmi and two younger brothers, Arjun and Nakul. Dada Thakur and Lakshmi are virtually like parents to Arjun and Nakul. Dada Thakur is highly respected in society and his word is considered law. Arjun marries a city girl, Meena. At first, Meena resents her husband's subservience to his elder brother, but when she realizes that Dada Thakur helped her father in his business, she becomes respectful towards her brother-in-law. When Arjun is wrongly accused of raping a schoolteacher, everyone awaits Dada Thakur's decision, which affects everyone in the household.

In a later flashback Ghajraj Thakur was the father of Dharamraj orders his nephew Jagannath to marry a villagers daughter whom he raped, though he is his sister Manorama's son. His brother-in-law Ranjit Singh shoots him as he is disappointed by his verdict. Enraged Ghajraj Thakur gives his final verdict before dying to abandon their family for 18 years and whoever visits his house will receive the same punishment and also not to share even a glass of water with them. Ghajraj Thakur also tells Dharamraj "Whenever we give a wrong verdict, that moment it is said that we die." At that second when he says that Ghajraj Thakur dies. Jagannath  from then builds envy on his uncle's family and waits for an opportunity to take revenge on them. He plans to bring a lady as a teacher to the school in the village and tells her to make Arjun fall for her. She does so, however, Arjun refuses to betray his wife.

Angered Jagannath kills her and makes the villagers believe that she committed suicide due to Arjun's actions. Dharamraj sentences 10 years of exile for his brother's family. Now Jagannath learns of his daughter's love for the younger brother Nakul and tries to kill Arjun with the help of his goons. Arjun goes to rescue of his brother Nakul and pregnant Meena goes to watch an annual festival where her water breaks and she gives birth. Meanwhile, Dharamraj fights Jagannath, Dharamraj's aunt rushes to Dharamraj, kills Jagannath and reveals the truth and tells him that he punished his brother without committing any mistake and also tells him that the crimes that were thrown onto Arjun were really done by Jagannath.

Then Dharamraj immediately remembers his father's quote that whenever he gives a wrong verdict, that moment he dies. In that shock, Dharamraj dies on knowing that he gave a wrong verdict. Now Arjun is shown taking the ancestral throne from his brother and continues the family's traditions.

Cast

Anil Kapoor as Dharamraj "Dada" Thakur and Arjun Thakur (double role)
Rajinikanth as Ghajraj Thakur (special appearance)
Rekha as Laxmi Thakur
Raveena Tandon as Meena Thakur
Harish Kumar as Nakul Thakur
Paresh Rawal as Gora Thakur / Mangala Thakur (double role) 
Sadashiv Amrapurkar as Gora's father
Kulbhushan Kharbanda as Ram Singh Thakur
Shakti Kapoor as Jagannath Singh
Ranjeet as Ranjeet Singh
Aruna Irani as Manorama Singh
Raasi 
Raksha
Kalpana
Y. Vijaya

Soundtrack
The music was composed by Viju Shah and lyrics penned by Anand Bakshi. Notable playback singers Kumar Sanu, Udit Narayan, Abhijeet, Kavita Krishnamurthy, Alka Yagnik, Anuradha Paudwal, Sonu Nigam, Jaspinder Narula have rendered their voices in this album.

References

External links 
 

2000 films
2000s Hindi-language films
Hindi remakes of Tamil films
Films directed by T. Rama Rao
Films scored by Viju Shah